The Alfred Bauer Prize was an annual film award, presented by the Berlin International Film Festival, as part of its Silver Bear series of awards, to a film that "opens new perspectives on cinematic art". The prize was suspended in 2020 after it was revealed that the founding director of the festival Alfred Bauer had been an active high-ranking Nazi closely involved in a propaganda organisation set up by Joseph Goebbels. The award was presented by the international jury under the title “The Silver Bear – 70th Berlinale”, for that year edition of the festival.

Winners

 Notes
 # Denotes Ex-aequo win

References

External links 

 Berlinale website

Alfred Bauer Prize
Awards disestablished in 2020
Awards established in 1987